Local Health Integration Networks (LHINs) were the health authorities responsible for regional administration of public healthcare services in the Canadian province of Ontario. Legacy LHIN functions were transferred to the new Ontario Health and the LHIN name was changed to Home and Community Care Support Services.

Created on April 1, 2007, the 14 LHINs were mandated with planning, integrating and distributing provincial funding for all public healthcare services at a regional level.  LHINs were locally based associations of the various health service providers, intended to generate enhanced community engagement.

Services
LHINs were community-based, non-profit organizations funded by the Ontario Ministry of Health and Long-Term Care to plan, fund and coordinate services delivered by:
 Hospitals
 Long-Term Care Homes
 Home and Community Care (formally Community Care Access Centres (CCACs))
 Community Support Service Agencies
 Mental Health and Addiction Agencies
 Community Health Centres (CHCs)

List
There were 14 LHINs:

 Erie St. Clair LHIN
 South West LHIN
 Waterloo Wellington LHIN
 Hamilton Niagara Haldimand Brant LHIN
 Central West LHIN
 Mississauga Halton LHIN
 Toronto Central LHIN
 Central LHIN
 Central East LHIN
 South East LHIN
 Champlain LHIN
 North Simcoe Muskoka LHIN
 North East LHIN
 North West LHIN

Notes

External links
Source, Ontario Ministry of Health and Long-Term Care